Make It or Break It is an American television series created by Holly Sorensen. The one-hour drama premiered on ABC Family on June 22, 2009. This fictional series revolves around four teen gymnasts as they train for the Olympics at the Rocky Mountain Gymnastic Training Center, also known as The Rock. Characters include members of the gymnasts' families, employees at The Rock, and workers at the local hangout, the Pizza Shack.

Main

The Rock
Sasha Belov (played by Neil Jackson) is the new coach at The Rock who replaces Marty Walsh after he moves to Denver. Sasha is the only Olympic gymnast to have ever beaten Marty and has four Olympic gold medals. Although he is very tough on his gymnasts, he cares for them profusely and wants them to reach their highest potential. Sasha is shown to be a tough coach, forcing Payson, Emily, Lauren and Kaylie to do a rigorous training exercise as a punishment for attending a party. He is also shown to be very compassionate and caring, comforting Emily's mother at one point and spending a lot of time helping Payson train after her surgery. Sasha had previously trained a group of gymnasts, but was forced to quit after a girl died as a result of a head injury on his watch. Following this incident, Sasha quit coaching, and consequently The Rock is his first coaching job in over five years. He dates Rock manager Summer for a while despite their different beliefs. He leaves The Rock in "At the Edge of the Worlds" because he feels that his presence is hurting the girls. He eventually returns to The Rock after Payson, Lauren and Emily visited him in Romania. He was later appointed to the position of coach to the US Worlds Gymnastics team. At the end of Season 3, it is hinted that he and Summer are getting back together.
Summer van Horne (played by Candace Cameron Bure) is Steve Tanner's ex-girlfriend and former assistant. She reveals to Lauren that in high school, before finding God, she slept with many boys and became known as "the school slut". After breaking up with Steve, she continues to have a relationship with Lauren and seems to serve as a sort of mother figure for the girl. She is the current manager of The Rock. She is a Christian who lives her life by faith, much to Sasha's amusement and frequent disdain. There is a measure of romantic tension between them that culminates in a kiss, although both agreed the kiss was inappropriate. However, it is evident that the two have feelings for each other, and in the episode "The Great Wall" they share a very passionate kiss in Sasha's trailer. On the episode "And The Rocky Goes To..." Summer drunkenly declares Sasha a "lovable guy". Sasha walks her home and says someday he wants to marry the right woman and kisses her. They mutually agree to break up before Sasha leaves the Rock temporarily. Steve and Summer rekindle their relationship after Sasha leaves, and Steve asks her to marry him. She asks him for time to think and, when she finds out that Sasha wants Emily to have an abortion when it's realized she's pregnant, decides that she needs to marry a man with similar moral views, and accepts Steve's proposal. However, in the final episode of the second season, Summer finds out that Lauren is the one who sent the video of Sasha and Payson supposedly kissing to the NGO and that Steve knew and did nothing in order to avoid Lauren being punished for it. She left Steve and Lauren once again. She later returns to try and comfort Lauren when Lauren is told she has to undergo open heart surgery. In the series finale, there are hints at a likely reconciliation between Sasha and Summer when he talks about regrets and how he wishes he tried harder to be with her and kissed her, asking if she still believed in miracles, and she responds by smiling.
Kim Keeler (played by Peri Gilpin) is Payson and Becca's mother. A no-nonsense stay at home mom, Kim acts as the steady guiding hand for her family and a moral sounding board for those around her. In particular she has often counseled the self-conscious Payson on issues related to beauty and femininity. Kim was works at the Rock as manager along with Summer van Horne. She took a break for a while but she then started again being the manager of the gym. She ran for the Rock Board but lost when a secret came out about her daughter.

Kmetko family
Emily Kmetko (played by Chelsea Hobbs) is the newest member of The Rock. Marty recruited her to The Rock after seeing her practicing at the YMCA in Fresno. In addition to her gymnastics training, she works nights and weekends at The Pizza Shack to help support her family financially despite it being against the rules to have a job. She falls in love with her coworker at The Pizza Shack, Damon, an aspiring songwriter. She becomes a member of the National Team and later is chosen for the World's Team, but her career is jeopardized when she is arrested for stealing her brother's medication when he went into a seizure and needed it desperately, but she didn't have enough money to pay for it. She later has sex with Damon, losing her virginity. A few weeks later, she breaks up with Damon saying she "can't have him mess with her head", only to find out at the Hungarian meet that she is pregnant with his child as a result of not using protection. (Chelsea Hobbs was pregnant in real life with her second child so the writers decided to incorporate it into the show.) She quits the sport as she refuses to have an abortion like the national chairman advised; shortly afterwards, she goes to Las Vegas to live with her godmother, with fond memories of her short time in gymnastics. While she is not seen in Season 3, she is mentioned three times.
Chloe Kmetko (played by Susan Ward) is Emily and Brian's mother. A flighty free spirit, Chloe became pregnant with Emily as a teenager and has struggled with fulfilling the role of a responsible mother ever since. While fiercely devoted to her daughter, and occasionally capable of moments of great insight, Chloe has always struggled to make ends meet and to take care of her special needs son and her enormously talented, but emotionally unstable, daughter. Chloe initially has an unsteady job at a beauty salon and then gets a job at a strip club as a bartender. For a while she dates Steve Tanner, who she had met anonymously online. While the two seem genuinely attracted to each other, they eventually break up as Emily is uncomfortable with Steve's monetary support of her family and Lauren worries that Chloe is trying to replace her mother. When Emily becomes pregnant, Chloe warns her about the difficulties of being a teenage mother and counsels Emily to have an abortion so that she can follow her dreams. She is tearful when Emily runs off to Las Vegas after deciding to have the baby and makes her final appearance closing off the family's account with The Rock. While leaving, she wishes the best for her daughter and describes life as a mom as a "hard, but beautiful life".
Brian Kmetko (played by Wyatt Smith) is Emily's younger half brother, and one of her biggest supporters. He uses a wheelchair and has a seizure disorder for which he takes medication. He is a very nice boy and supportive of Emily.

Keeler family
Payson Keeler (played by Ayla Kell) is the top female gymnast at The Rock and one of the top ranked female gymnasts in the nation. She is a driven and dedicated professional who seems to live only for gymnastics. Unlike the other girls, she seems uninterested in boys and is more wary of causing trouble. When Marty leaves the Rock she initially feels the most betrayed of all the girls, however she approves of Sasha as the replacement coach. Alone among the girls she sees Sasha's strict disciplinarian style of management as a positive thing. She falls during her uneven bars routine at Nationals and suffers a lumbosacral fracture, which is believed to be a career-ending injury. Crushed, Payson seems to give up on her dreams and enters a regular school where she struggles to adapt and falls in with a group of slackers. However, the Keelers hear of an experimental surgery which might allow Payson to compete again. Despite her parents' concerns, Payson goes through with the operation and makes a full recovery. However, in the months between her injury and recovery, her body has changed in ways which make her previous, power oriented, style of gymnastics difficult. With Sasha's help, she develops a more artistic style of gymnastics and successfully petitions onto the World's Team. During her training she develops a crush on Sasha and impulsively kisses him, but he pushes her away. Payson immediately realizes her mistake and apologizes to Sasha who explains that he understands. However, a tape of the kiss, edited to remove Sasha's refusal of Payson's advances, gets sent to the National Committee and results in Sasha retiring. Payson and Sasha have made amends since he returned from Romania. She falls on her ankle at Worlds but came through for her team, her parents, and Sasha when she did her last vault flawlessly and stuck the landing on one foot. Payson is the most determined and serious of all the gymnasts, even though they all share the same ambition. She is swayed by Max, but says that she will not let a boy "get in her head and mess with her game." But eventually ends up confessing her feelings for him. He ends the relationship in Season 3, and she starts dating a new boy named Rigo, to whom she loses her virginity. Payson is one of only two characters to appear in every episode; the other is Kaylie Cruz.
Kim Keeler (played by Peri Gilpin) is Payson and Becca's mother. A no-nonsense stay-at-home mom, Kim acts as the steady guiding hand for her family and a moral sounding board for those around her. In particular she has often counseled the self-conscious Payson on issues related to beauty and femininity. Kim was working at the Rock as manager. She took a break for a while but she then started again being the manager of the gym. She ran for the Rock Board but lost when a secret came out about her daughter. 
Mark Keeler (played by Brett Cullen) is Payson and Becca's father. After he loses his job in Boulder, he begins commuting to Minnesota for work. He is a nice man and cares most about his family. 
Becca Keeler (played by Mia Rose Frampton) is Payson's younger sister, and a junior gymnast at The Rock. She is not as focused or serious about her gymnastics as Payson, although Payson did get jealous when she won an award for improvement.

Cruz family
Kaylie Cruz (played by Josie Loren) is an elite gymnast at The Rock. At the beginning of the series, she was secretly dating fellow gymnast Carter. She breaks up with Carter after learning that he slept with her friend Lauren Tanner. At Nationals, she edges out Kelly Parker to become National Champion. She becomes obsessed with losing weight to help her gymnastics and develops anorexia. At the tryouts for the World's Team, she faints during her beam routine and is rushed to the hospital. She is named to the team on the condition that she is deemed medically fit to compete. While in rehab, Kaylie befriends a model, Maeve, who teaches her how to "play along" to get out of rehab. However, despite her attempts, Kaylie's parents refuse to let her go back to training and Kaylie refuses to acknowledge she has a problem. When Maeve suddenly dies of heart failure due to anorexia, Kaylie realizes the dangers and admits she needs help. When she was going to Maeve's funeral she was supposed to say some words but she couldn't because she knew she was lying, so instead she sings a song with Damon in the shack for Maeve. She gets back into the groove of the rock after she's cleared and after struggling with whether or not to inform the public about her eating condition, she finally tells her story. The NGO frowns on upon it and says, "They're done". They end up winning gold at Worlds and Kaylie starts dating Austin. Their relationship goes smoothly throughout Season 3, but when Austin gets cut from the men's team, he blames it on a move Kaylie suggested he do and blames her for not doing well and breaks up with her, leaving her in heartbreak. She tries to go see him in his room, possibly hoping to make up with him, but instead finds it vacant except for a small shoe box of items that are addressed to her and she cries realizing it is truly over for her and Austin. However, he shows up when her drug test comes back positive eliminating her spot on the Women's Olympic team and comforts her and the two can be seen reconciling their differences. In the end it is revealed that Wendy is kicked off the Olympic team, giving Kaylie a spot on the U.S. Olympic Women's Gymnastic team. Kaylie is the only character other than Payson to appear in every episode.
Ronnie Cruz (played by Rosa Blasi) is Leo and Kaylie's mother. She was a successful singer in the '80's. She reminds Kaylie that real love waits, and not to miss out on her dream as she tends to miss her singing career and how she could have gone further with it. She had an affair with Marty while he was coach of The Rock. When her husband Alex found out, he moved out and filed for divorce. She is Kaylie's co-manager, handling her press. Despite her troubled marriage, Ronnie and Alex still care about each other. When Kaylie goes to rehab for an eating disorder, Ronnie especially puts her heart into helping Kaylie and vows never to let it happen again. Ronnie didn't want to get divorced as Alex did. She did however, keep most of that to herself and assured Kaylie it was for the best.
Alex Cruz (played by Jason Manuel Olazabal) is Leo and Kaylie's father, and a former baseball star. He was Kaylie's manager until she fired him and hired MJ. Kaylie eventually rehires him and Ronnie to be her co-managers in the hopes that it will make them get back together. Alex has always been pushing Kaylie in gymnastics. Some believe that he triggered her eating disorder because in Season 1 he got a scale in the living room and he checked her weight very often.
Leo Cruz (played by Marcus Coloma) is Kaylie's older brother and a former gymnast. He is a college student, but he is moving back to Boulder to help Sasha with some coaching at The Rock. He is very protective of Kaylie and punches Carter when he learns he cheated on her. He goes back to college in Season 2. many girls like Leo and think he is cute, and when he visits the gym, the girls all pay attention to him.

Tanner family
Lauren Tanner (played by Cassie Scerbo) is a gymnast at The Rock, nicknamed "The Queen of the Beam." She is also known to be a "bitch" and for her snobbish attitude and snappy comebacks and remark. In the first few episodes she is seen being a snob to Emily. She is mean to her father by showing him up in front of his mother which she shows Chloe Kmetko and Emily Kmetko. She is in love with Kaylie's boyfriend Carter, with whom she has sex - losing her virginity - at a party. After Carter and Kaylie break up, they resume sleeping together, but she eventually breaks up with him and gets him kicked out of the gym when he can't tell her that he loves her because of how she manipulates and uses others to get what she wants. Her mother is an addict who abandoned her and her father when she was young; possibly the reason why she acts like she does. After her mother dies, she learns that her mother tried to see her many times even to simply say goodbye, but her father would always force her to keep away. This resulted in her shortly moving out and in with Summer. Lauren and Payson go against each other to see who will be the captain but ultimately end up becoming co-captains. While training for the Olympics, Lauren suffers bouts of dizziness and blackouts. She goes to a doctor who confirms she has a heart condition. Payson knows of this and wants Lauren to tell the truth but Lauren refuses, afraid of losing her spot on the team. When Lauren prepares for a performance on the beam, Payson is terrified of her being injured and tells Coach McIntire of Lauren's condition. In the hospital, a furious Lauren blames Payson for the situation and says she never wants to see her again. Trying to make up for it, Payson goes to convince a well-regarded surgeon to perform a risky operation on Lauren. It is successful as Lauren is eager to train although McIntire and her father both doubt she's able to make the team. After recovering just enough, she is able to go through trials. During the trials for the Olympic team, Lauren figures out that Wendy was the one drugging Kaylie. Finally, when the decisions are made about who makes the London Olympic team, Lauren is once again "Queen of the Beam" when she receives one of the five spots along with her three best friends.
Steve Tanner (played by Anthony Starke) is Lauren's father and former manager of The Rock. Steve is a wealthy lawyer who always tries to get the best for his daughter, even if she clearly doesn't deserve it. He was engaged to Summer van Horne twice, but Summer broke up with Steve after discovering that Steve had threatened Lauren's mother not to come to Nationals. His second relationship with Summer, starting after Sasha leaves The Rock, ends when she discovers that Steve had kept it from her that Lauren sent an edited video of Payson kissing Sasha and protected her from getting into trouble at the cost of nearly ruining Sasha's career. Summer severs all ties with them, vowing that she wanted nothing to do with them ever again. However, she comes to comfort Lauren during her heart condition problem and make amends with both of them.
Leslie Tanner is Lauren's mother and Steve's ex-wife. Leslie was a drug addict and abandoned Lauren twice as child, which is what made her bitter as a teenager. Although she tried to visit Lauren every year, Steve wouldn't allow it and threatened that if she saw Lauren then he would have her arrested despite knowing how desperately Lauren wanted to see her. Steve then kept her away from Nationals, making Lauren believe her mother never truly loved her. Leslie died in Season 2 after a car accident occurred when she tearfully drove away from the Rock, fighting her urge to see Lauren. Lauren learns that Steve kept her mother from her and in her fury leaves him and temporarily stayed with Summer. Lauren, during a competition at the Nationals, dedicates her bars routine during the competition to her mother in her honor, realizing she truly loved her all along.

The Pizza Shack
Damon Young (played by Johnny Pacar) is an aspiring songwriter, member of the band Shelter Pups, and friend of Razor. He and Emily become close while he is filling in for Razor at The Pizza Shack and secretly starts a relationship with her. They take it to the "next level" in Season 2, with him taking her virginity. As a result of not using protection, Emily discovers she is pregnant. She tells him she wants to become a family with him and their baby, but runs to Las Vegas after finding out that he and Kaylie kissed while they were broken up. Damon later shortly follows her to reconcile with her and hopes to become a family with their unborn child.
Razor (played by Nico Tortorella) is Emily's co-worker at The Pizza Shack, and lead singer of the band Shelter Pups. He goes on tour as a roadie and asks Damon to fill in for him at The Pizza Shack and to watch over Emily. When he returns, he is surprised to learn that Emily and Damon are dating, but he continues to be a good friend to both of them.

Other characters
Austin Tucker (played by Zane Holtz) is the men's Olympic champion. He begins training at The Rock, inspired by how dedicated the Rock girls are. He and Kaylie don't get along because she doesn't want Payson and Emily to get distracted by boys and the drama they seem to create. He later invites the girls to a party at his lake house. Lauren, Payson, Emily and Kaylie all go despite promising not to go. Austin and Kaylie kiss at his party after he comforts her. He also notices Kaylie becoming thinner, and tries to stop her anorexia because his younger sister had problems because of an eating disorder. He eventually brings it up to her parents, and Kaylie asks him why he's doing this. He admits he cares for her, yet he doesn't know why. When Kaylie faints on the beam during the Worlds tryouts, he catches her. He begins to date her throughout Season 3, but later when he is cut from the men's team, blames her for his cut and breaks up with her. The two patch things up when he comes to comfort Kaylie when her drug test comes back positive for a banned substance just before Olympic trials.
Max Spencer (played by Joshua Bowman) is a new gymnast in The Rock. He first appeared as a photographer friend of Austin. Austin later revealed that Max is a gymnast and wants to train in Denver or at The Rock. In the end, he chooses to train at the Rock. Max has shown an interest in Payson, but when Payson tells him over and over that she is only focused on gymnastics, he starts dating Lauren. In the episode "What Lies Beneath", Max comes out as bisexual to Austin and then kisses him as a result of Payson telling him that she loves him. Later in that episode of the second season, Max meets Payson after Worlds and tells her he loves her and they hug. In Season 3, Max breaks up with Payson by letter saying he needed to "find" himself and that he loves her, breaking Payons's heart. Lauren hints that he is in the Hamptons, which is a play on the fact that Josh Bowman left the show to star in Revenge (TV series), another show which is set in the Hamptons.
Marty Walsh (played by Erik Palladino) is the former coach of The Rock and a three-time Olympic gold medalist. He leaves the club after Steve Tanner blackmails him with information about his affair with Ronnie Cruz. Marty begins coaching at the Denver Elite Gymnastic Club, where his top gymnast is Kelly Parker. Although the National Team trains at The Rock, Marty is named their coach. He is fired from the National Team by Ellen Beals after he tells her to stop bullying Emily during practice. Marty really liked Emily and he cared for all of the gymnasts. He was very sad to leave the Rock but he fibbed and said it was because he liked Denver more which was not true.
Carter Anderson (played by Zachary Burr Abel) is Kaylie's ex-boyfriend and former gymnast at The Rock, currently training at Denver Elite. He had sex with Lauren, her losing her virginity, after a fight with Kaylie, but did not tell Kaylie about the affair because of fear that she'd break up with him. He later gave Kaylie a necklace that had belonged to his late mother. When his relationship with Kaylie is revealed at a party, he argues with Kaylie's dad about who loves Kaylie more. He stands up for Kaylie - refusing to name the girl he's involved with to Sasha - and is subsequently suspended from the Rock and banned from Nationals. He later reveals his affair with Lauren, causing Kaylie to break up with him. Carter shows great resentment towards Lauren, blaming her for everything that happened between him and Kaylie. However, after being kicked out of his home, he is forced to live in Lauren's attic, and he grows less hostile towards her. He continues to try to win Kaylie back, using it as motivation to get his act back together. The two share a kiss, but Kaylie then discovers that Lauren and Carter are still in contact and that Carter has been living in Lauren's house. He kisses Lauren in the episode "Are We Family". He becomes Lauren's boyfriend after he and Kaylie break up. He breaks up with Lauren after she steals Emily's floor routine where afterwards he tells her that the reason he could never tell her he loves her is because she purposely does things that hurt other people for her own personal gain. When their relationship becomes public, he is kicked out of The Rock and begins training at Denver Elite.
Nicky Russo (played by Cody Longo) is a former gymnast at The Rock and winner of the men's silver medal at Nationals. He is extremely dedicated to his sport and considers any time not spent working on his routines as time wasted. He has feelings for Payson; he helps her obtain cortisone illegally for her back, and they share a kiss in "California Girls". Nicky's agent hopes to pair him with Kaylie as a "power couple" of gymnastics. First Kaylie and Nicky hated each other. He always did like Payson. Although Nicky and Kaylie share several moments of sexual tension, he eventually decides to move to Denver to escape The Rock drama.
Kelly Parker (played by Nicole Gale Anderson) is the former National Champion, who trains at Denver Elite. Before Payson's injury, Kelly and Payson were serious rivals. Kelly makes fun of all of The Rock girls, especially Emily. At Nationals, Kelly places second behind Kaylie Cruz. She is the first to notice how dangerously thin Kaylie is becoming and decides to befriend her to learn more about her weight at the time hoping to expose Kaylie's eating disorder, but eventually develops a less hostile relationship with her. She bonds with the girls at the Olympic training center but loses her place for the Olympic team. When her mother, Sheila, makes noise about this being a case of discrimination (since Jordan was kept and is black; the same skin color of the coach) Kelly snaps that she's quitting gymnastics to find a new path in life and "fires" Sheila as her mother. She shows up at the Olympic try outs to support the girls.
MJ Martin (played by Marsha Thomason) is a sports agent who agrees to represent Kaylie. A former tennis star, she now works for one of the major sports agencies in America. She and Sasha previously had a relationship when Sasha was a young gymnast, and they still make references to the relationship. MJ initially wanted to represent Payson, but Payson's parents would not allow it. Kaylie asked MJ to represent her, but MJ said no, until Kaylie proved she really wanted to succeed in gymnastics. MJ tries to portray Nicky and Kaylie as a golden couple, much to the two's annoyance.
Ellen Beals (played by Michelle Clunie) is part of the National Committee. She doesn't like Sasha and wants to get rid of him. Also she is shown to dislike Emily in many episodes. After the National Committee fires Marty Walsh, she takes over as coach of the National Team. She turns in evidence incriminating Sasha to the national committee which is the edited video tape of Payson kissing him. After the original tape resurfaces she comes under inquiry by the national committee which causes her to lose her credibility and influence with the committee. In Season 3, although she never makes an appearance again, she is mentioned a lot throughout the season particularly in the episode "Time is of the Essence." 
Coach MacIntire (played by Dondre Whitfield) is the U.S women's gymnastics coach. At first he is very hard on girls by telling them how bad they are and is always yells at them when they mess up. He also pairs the girls up Kelly and Kaylie, Payson with Lauren, and Jordan with Wendy. Payson goes to NGO and tells them Coach MacIntire is too hard on them and the girls are getting worse not improving. He holds a meeting where he and the girls make peace. The girls begin to warm up to him.
Jordan Randall (played by Chelsea Tavares) is a gymnast who pushes her way into the Olympic training center. She had been a former teammate of Kaylie at a camp but the two had a falling out as Jordan refused to let Kaylie train with her. While Coach McIntire is wary at first, he's soon impressed by her skills on a videotape and lets her try out for the team. There is tension between Jordan and the other girls, who suspect her of being the "mole" in the team. She and Kaylie manage to patch up their differences while being forced to room together. When the two's former coach comes to the center to train, Jordan is tense around him and erupts when she learns the coach is having private sessions with Wendy. She goes to confront him at his hotel and after being turned away, smashes up his car. Kaylie talks to her as Jordan confesses that the coach had been molesting her for years starting at camp. This is the reason she cut Kaylie off, so she wouldn't suffer the same fate and risk being sexually assaulted as well. Kaylie tells Jordan she can help her expose the truth and they run off as the police arrive to check the damaged car. Kaylie tells Coach McIntire but Jordan refuses to confirm this, afraid no one will believe her. Kaylie takes to the Internet to discover that other girls have been molested as well and the coach is arrested. She is one of the five girls chosen on the official Olympic team.
Wendy Capshaw (played by Amanda Leighton) is a gymnast chosen to take part in the Olympic training with the Rock girls. She appears to be an incredibly perky and always cheerful girl who constantly talks and annoys the others with her happy attitude and seemingly naive outlook on life. She turns out to be the "mole" giving information to Kelly's mother, Sheila, to tell the coach and hurt the team. When the girls discover this, an angry Kelly "fires" Sheila as her mother and Sheila confronts Wendy on how the girl knew this would backfire on Sheila. Wendy not only confirms this but reveals that her entire perky attitude is all an act as she plans to "take those Rock girls down" and be a champion on her own. She nearly gets away with drugging Kaylie, but Lauren, knowing how she couldn't be up to any good, finds out about her plan and exposes her. She is subsequently kicked off the team and is never seen again.
Jake (played by Russell Pitts) is a wrestler who takes special interest in Lauren. He calls the gymnasts barbie dolls. He thinks that the gymnasts are just girls and are not strong like him and his team of wrestlers. Lauren proves him wrong. Jake hides Otis, a big gold head that the teams try to get. Whoever ends up with him, wins. The wrestlers do whatever they can to make sure they get Otis, and that the gymnasts don't.
Rigo (played by Tom Maden) is introduced in the third season as a BMX rider at the USA Training Center. Lauren inadvertently introduces Rigo to Payson, and the two start dating thereafter. Rigo is there for Payson, taking her to see Dr. Walker for Lauren's heart condition, and even reaching out to Sasha because he knew Payson needed Sasha's support. Payson loses her virginity to Rigo in the episode "Listen to the Universe", and he meets her parents in the finale "United Stakes".

Fictional gymnasts
Lists of American drama television series characters
Make It or Break It